12 Little Spells is the seventh studio album by American bassist and singer Esperanza Spalding. It was released on October 19, 2018, by Concord Records. Each song was released individually from October 7–18, 2018 and each track also contains a music video. 

12 Little Spells debuted at number 31 on the US Billboard Top Album Sales and number 1 on the Jazz Albums chart. At the 62nd Annual Grammy Awards in 2020, the album won the Grammy Award for Best Jazz Vocal Album.

Background
The album is a decidedly significant departure from her previous work, utilising an experimental framing device in which each song correlates to a single body part. With this, Spalding stated she hoped to distance herself from the identity of a "musician" and associate herself with an unbound experimentalism that cannot be categorised.

Critical reception

Lucas Phillips of Boston Globe commented "Weird is too often a cover for mediocrity or an epithet meant to describe what is foreign to us. Sure, Esperanza Spalding’s new music and video project, “12 Little Spells,” is weird. Weird like seeing the inside of the singer-bassist's eyeballs and an animation that for all the world resembles a uterus dancing to the beat. The music and lyrics lean in similar directions. But that isn't a cover for mediocrity, nor does it represent anything so unfamiliar".

Libby Cudmore of Paste added "Musically, there is nothing constrained about her performance as a vocalist or a bassist. It’s extremely organic, as though each song is unfolding right before you, rather than after laboring in a recording studio... This is not dinner jazz, but no one who picks up an Esperanza Spalding album expects it to be. Her voice and her bass are a listener’s guide on a tour with no map and no destination, but where wonders abound". Writing in Echoes, Adam Mattera singled out specific tracks for merit: "Touch In Mine" renders everything Solange has been retreading over her last couple of albums somewhat redundant, while in some alternate universe you could even imagine the Chic-in-outer-space groove of "You Have To Dance" being a hit". John Pareles and Jon Caramanica of The New York Times listed the album as the fourth best album of the year in the publication's 28 best albums of 2018 list, stating that in spite of "devious melodies, odd meters and cleverly interlocking patterns", Spalding achieves complex insight with "such breezy charm that the songs come across as lighthearted, [and] even lightheaded".

Track listing

Charts

Personnel
 Esperanza Spalding – vocals, acoustic bass, electric bass
 Matt Stevens – guitar, electric bass
 Justin Tyson –  drums, organ, synths, vocals, beats & programming
 Aaron Burnett – saxophone
 Burniss Travis – electric bass, acoustic bass, vocals
 Corey King – vocals
 Rob Schwimmer – continuum
 Orchestra ("12 Little Spells")
 Eric Reed – French horn
 Laura Weiner – French horn
 Brandon Ridenour – trumpet
 John Blevins – trumpet
 Richard Harris – tenor/bass trombone
 Julietta Curenton – flute, piccolo
 Katie Hyun – violin
 Sami Merdinian – violin 
 Fernando Lodeiro – recording and mixing engineer

References

2018 albums
Esperanza Spalding albums
Grammy Award for Best Jazz Vocal Album